Perdona nuestros pecados is a Mexican television series produced by Lucero Suárez for TelevisaUnivision. It is based on the Chilean telenovela of the same name, created by Pablo Illanes. The series stars Emmanuel Palomares and Oka Giner. It premiered on Las Estrellas on 30 January 2023.

Premise 
Elsa Quiroga (Oka Giner) is the daughter of Armando Quiroga (Jorge Salinas), the richest man in the town of San Juan. She falls in love with Andrés Martínez (Emmanuel Palomares), son of Silvia (Marisol del Olmo), the Montero family's maid. Elsa and Andrés decide to have a secret relationship, and when Armando discovers it, he opposes of the relationship because for him, Andrés is not worthy of his daughter's love.

Cast 
 Jorge Salinas as Armando Quiroga
 Erika Buenfil as Estela Cáceres
 César Évora as Héctor Morales
 Sabine Moussier as Ángela Bulnes de Montero
 Marisol del Olmo as Silvia Martínez
 Emmanuel Palomares as Andrés Martínez
 Oka Giner as Elsa Quiroga
 Osvaldo de León as Gerardo Montero
 Ricardo Fastlicht as Lamberto Montero
 Óscar Bonfiglio as Father Reynaldo
 Montserrat Marañón as Flor
 Rocío de Santiago as Antonia Martínez
 Fernanda Urdapilleta as Aurora Montero
 Giuseppe Gamba as Horacio Morales
 Daniela Cordero as Elena Quiroga
 Karla Farfán as Meche Morales
 Gina Pedret as Guillermina
 Carlo Guerra as Carlos Morales
 Sofía Mariel Espejel as Sofía Quiroga
 Pato de la Garza as Martín Quiroga
 Fausto Emiliano as Domingo Quiroga
 Hugo Aceves as Oliver
 Ricardo Kleinbaum as Dr. Leonidas
 Giovanna Duffour as Ingrid
 Adrián Laut as Renzo

Recurring 
 Magda Karina as Clemencia
 Luz Edith Rojas as Nora
 Olivia Collins as Irene Delacroix
 Enoc Leaño as Comisario Fuentes

Production 
In May 2022, the series was announced at TelevisaUnivision's upfront for the 2022–2023 television season. Filming began on 12 October 2022. On 25 October 2022, an extensive cast and characters list was published. The first teaser of the series was shown on 2 January 2023. The series is set to premiere on 30 January 2023.

Ratings 
 
}}

Episodes

Notes

References

External links 
 

2023 telenovelas
2023 Mexican television series debuts
2020s Mexican television series
Televisa telenovelas
Mexican telenovelas
Spanish-language telenovelas
Mexican television series based on Chilean television series